Donny! is an American sitcom created by Donny Deutsch and Angie Day. The series aired on USA Network from November 10 to December 15, 2015.

On August 3, 2016, USA announced that the series was cancelled after one season.

Cast

Main
Donny Deutsch as Donny Deutsch 
Emily Tarver as Pam
Meera Rohit Kumbhani as Zoe
Jessica Renee Russell as Violet 
Hailey Giles as Jackie 
Fiona Robert as Coco Deutsch
Jacob Thomas Anderson as Jagger Deutsch

Guest
Tina Casciani as Galina
Katie Morrison as Becky
Shannon O'Neill as Stage Manager
Amin Joseph as Trainer
Christie Brinkley as Herself
Sean Patrick Doyle as Coach Gordon
Lesli Margherita as Piper (ex-wife)

Episodes

Reception 
On Rotten Tomatoes, Donny! has an aggregate score of 23% based on 3 positive and 10 negative critic reviews.  The website’s consensus reads: "Often unfunny and occasionally creepy, Donny! draws unfavorable comparisons to any number of superior improvisational comedies."

References

External links
 
 

2015 American television series debuts
2015 American television series endings
2010s American single-camera sitcoms
USA Network original programming